"I Know" is a song by British record producer and DJ Shift K3Y. The song was released in the United Kingdom on 21 September 2014 as a digital download. The song peaked at number 25 on the UK Singles Chart. It was written and produced by Shift K3Y.

Music video
A music video to accompany the release of "I Know" was first released onto YouTube on 12 August 2014. The video has accumulated over thirty million views.

Track listing

Chart performance

References

2014 songs
2014 singles
Shift K3Y songs
Columbia Records singles
Songs written by Shift K3Y